Cynthia Wu-Maheux is a Canadian actress from Trois-Rivières, Quebec. She is most noted for her performance in the film On My Mother's Side (L'Origine des espèces), for which she received a Prix Iris nomination for Best Supporting Actress at the 19th Quebec Cinema Awards in 2017.

She has also appeared in the films Honey, I'm in Love (Le Grand Départ), Polytechnique, The Bossé Empire (L'Empire Bo$$é), L'Affaire Dumont and Montreal, White City (Montréal la blanche), and the television series C.A, Les Hauts et les bas de Sophie Paquin, Tactik, Trauma, Plan B and District 31.

References

External links

21st-century Canadian actresses
Canadian film actresses
Canadian television actresses
Canadian stage actresses
Canadian actresses of Chinese descent
Actresses from Quebec
French Quebecers
People from Trois-Rivières
Living people
Year of birth missing (living people)